Devendra Raj Kandel (born March 19, 1957 in Rampurwa) is a Nepalese politician, former minister and serving as the Member of House Of Representatives (Nepal) elected from Nawalparasi-4, Province No. 5. He is the member of Nepali Congress. He is also elected as chairman of the management committee of a college in India.

References 

1957 births
Living people
Nepal MPs 2017–2022
Nepali Congress politicians from Lumbini Province

Nepal MPs 1994–1999
Nepal MPs 1999–2002